Anne Elizabeth Hollinghurst (born 4 March 1964) is a Church of England bishop and former youth worker. Since September 2015, she has been the Bishop of Aston, the suffragan bishop in the Diocese of Birmingham. From 2010 to 2015, she was Vicar of St Peter's Church, St Albans.

Early life
Hollinghurst was born on 4 March 1964 to William and Audrey Bailey. Her early experience of the Church of England was in the Liberal Catholic tradition.

Her first career was as a youth worker in suburban Sussex and then in inner-city Nottingham. She entered Trinity College, Bristol, an Evangelical Anglican theological college, to train for ordained ministry and graduated from the University of Bristol with a Bachelor of Arts (BA) degree in 1996.

Ordained ministry
Hollinghurst was ordained in the Church of England: made a deacon at Petertide 1996 (30 June) by Patrick Harris, Bishop of Southwell at Southwell Minster and ordained a priest the Petertide following (28 June 1997), by Alan Morgan, Bishop of Sherwood at Christ Church, Chilwell. From 1996 to 1999, she served her curacy at St Saviours in the Meadows, Nottingham. She shared this curacy with her husband, Steve Hollinghurst, who is also a Church of England priest. From 1999 to 2005, she was jointly the Anglican chaplain for the University of Derby and a chaplain of Derby Cathedral. During this time, she also lectured on religion and gender in the Religious Studies Department of Derby University.

In 2005, she moved to Manchester. She was appointed domestic chaplain to the Bishop of Manchester, Nigel McCulloch, and a residentiary canon of Manchester Cathedral. She completed a Master of Studies (MSt) degree at Hughes Hall, Cambridge in 2010. On 12 January 2010, she became Vicar of St Peter's Church, St Albans in the Diocese of St Albans. In 2011, she was elected a member of the House of Clergy of the St Albans General Synod.

Episcopal ministry
On 2 July 2015, Hollinghurst was announced as the next Bishop of Aston, a suffragan bishopric in the Diocese of Birmingham. On 29 September 2015, she was consecrated a bishop by Justin Welby, the Archbishop of Canterbury, during a service at St Paul's Cathedral, London. She is the 10th Bishop of Aston.

Personal life
Hollinghurst's research interests include feminist theology, gender and the language of God and Christian spirituality. Hollinghurst has contributed a chapter on Franciscan spirituality and nature to the book Earthed.

In 1984, she married Steve Hollinghurst. He is a priest in the Church of England who has worked with the Church Army since 2003. He is currently a part-time tutor for the Church Army and a freelance researcher, consultant and trainer in culture and mission.

Hollinghurst's sister, Helen, is also a Church of England priest.

References

1964 births
Living people
British social workers
Alumni of Trinity College, Bristol
Alumni of the University of Bristol
21st-century English Anglican priests
Alumni of Hughes Hall, Cambridge
Women Anglican bishops
Bishops of Aston
Proponents of Christian feminism
Christian feminist theologians
English feminist writers